Kathryn Sarah Collins Jupe (born 12 December 1973), known professionally as Katy Cavanagh, is an English actress. She is known for portraying the role of Julie Carp in the ITV soap opera Coronation Street from 2008 to 2015. She also had regular roles in BBC drama The Cops (1998–2001), and the ITV drama Bob & Rose (2001). In November 2017, she appeared in the comedy television film Murder on the Blackpool Express.

Early life
Cavanagh was born in North Shields, Northumberland, the daughter of Anne, a drama teacher, and Geoff, a headmaster. She grew up in Bolton, Lancashire. She was educated at Canon Slade School and trained at RADA and National Youth Theatre.

Career
Cavanagh has appeared regularly on British television since 1997. She had a regular role as Mel in the award-winning seriesThe Cops from 1998 to 2001. In 2004, she had a regular role as Sergeant Dawn "Spike" Milligan in the television series  Dalziel and Pascoe. In 2006, she appeared in an episode of the Channel 4 drama Shameless as Shirley Lawson. In 2008, she joined the  ITV soap opera Coronation Street as Julie Carp.

Cavanagh appeared in a stage adaptation of the serial, entitled Coronation Street: Street of Dreams in May 2012. Cavanagh filled the pivotal role of the "Angel of the North"; who guided Paul O'Grady through fifty years of storylines. Cavanagh said that the prospect of playing Julie on stage was "very exciting".

In 2013, she appeared in the short film Bradford Halifax London as Mam.

In 2014, Coronation Street was awarded the RTS Programme Awards for Soap Opera and Continuing Drama.

Since late 2013, she has voiced the advertisements for British supermarket chain Iceland.

In February 2015, it was announced that she would leave Coronation Street in order to pursue other interests. Her final episode aired on 3 July 2015.

Personal life
Cavanagh is married to filmmaker and producer Chris Jupe. They have three children: Noah (born 25 February 2005), an actor, Jemima (born c. 2007), and Jacobi (born 2013).

Filmography

References

External links

1973 births
Living people
People from North Shields
Actresses from Tyne and Wear
Actors from Bolton
Actors from County Durham
English television actresses
English stage actresses
English radio actresses
People educated at Canon Slade School
English soap opera actresses
National Youth Theatre members
Alumni of RADA